Pandora Moon is a fictional character in the E4 television series Skins, portrayed by Lisa Backwell. Pandora and Effy Stonem are the only "Second generation" characters to appear in series two, and she is prominent throughout the third and fourth series. She is known for being the sexually naive and immature friend of Effy Stonem from very early on in the series, and later for her troubled relationship with her boyfriend, Thomas Tomone.

Characterisation
Pandora starts off the series as Effy's polar opposite - while Effy is crafty and mature, Pandora is very childish and sexually naive. Despite this, they make unlikely friends, after Pandora shows Effy a circus trick she learned. Pandora's childish playfulness and sexual naivety are most likely linked to the old-fashioned views of her mother, Angela, who goes to great lengths to protect her from the world in which she eventually becomes embroiled. Her name may be a reference to the inner satellite of Saturn.

Pandora soon sheds her more childish side and matures after losing her virginity in her only centric episode. However, she then becomes involved in a troubled relationship with Thomas Tomone, a Congolese migrant new to the country, all the while living in the shadow of Effy, to whom she eventually stands up.

Character history

Series 2
Pandora, unlike most of the other "Second Generation" cast, makes her first appearance in Series 2, in which she joins Effy Stonem at the same school as Abigail Stock. Her childish naivety initially repulses Effy, but she eventually becomes her friend after Pandora shows off a circus trick that she learned. She later accompanies Effy to various nightclubs and raves, mostly on her quest to solve the relationship issues between Tony, Michelle, Sid and Cassie. When buying some spliff from Cassie, Pandora sees Cassie kissing another girl and is noticeably shocked, presumably having never encountered homosexuality before. After smoking the weed for the first time, she gets high very easily. Throughout the entire episode, her mother Angela continually rings her, and their conversation suggests that Angela is somewhat overprotective of her.

Effy, finally taking pity on Pandora, gives the art coursework Sid intended for her to Pandora, risking expulsion from the school.

Series 3
After joining Effy as a main character in the show, Pandora attends Roundview College. She is first seen within a swarm of blonde girls that take an interest in Katie Fitch's boyfriend Danny and immediately states that she is desperate to finally have sex (or "surf and turf") and lose her virginity. Later she walks out of her Hair & Beauty lesson (a course her mother forced her to take) and eventually finds and joins the Psychology class where she hopes to find Effy, who had just exited the lesson in order to have sex with Cook. In "Cook", Pandora throws up at Cook's birthday party, demonstrating low alcohol tolerance levels, but Cook insists on dragging them to a party not far away rather than allowing the girls to take her home.

In "Thomas", Pandora and Effy meet Thomas Tomone, a newly arrived migrant from the Congo as he is busy gorging himself on some free doughnuts he obtained from the local newsagent. Thomas offers her some, but she eats too much and is violently sick. As Thomas carries her home with Effy, they discover Effy's mother, Anthea is having an affair with her husband's boss. The next day, Pandora comes across Thomas after a dance class and invites him to her aunt's home for some tea and scones. There, they discover that the tea is made from cannabis, and share a kiss in the greenhouse. After Thomas manages to defeat Johnny White, the local gangster, Thomas enters his bedroom to discover Panda is sitting on his bed in her underwear, and she persuades him to take her virginity. However, before they can consummate, Thomas' mother arrives and, horrified by the presence of alcohol, drugs and sex in the apartment, drags him back to the Congo, breaking Pandora's heart.

In "Pandora, Pandora is still reeling from the loss of Thomas and attempts to console herself by organising a "girls only" birthday pyjama party with Effy, Katie, Emily, and Naomi, with the sole intention of playing Twister and learning about sexuality from her friends. Her mother, Angela, is revealed to be somewhat neurotic and old-fashioned, forcing the girls to throw away all of their cigarettes and alcohol, treating them like little children and trying to keep the party free of any boys. The girls are soon bored and drug Angela with MDMA in some brownies. The girls quietly express disgust over Pandora's behaviour behind her back.

When the party gets out of hand, after Katie's footballer boyfriend brings his friends over and JJ and Cook attempt to sneak in, Pandora retreats to the bathroom in tears, angry with Effy, whom she believes spiked the brownies, pining for her boyfriend. When she finally comes out, Cook is the only one left at the party and, seeing her distraught, he suggests they play Twister, cheering her up. After they finish, Cook offers to take her virginity, and they proceed to have sex. The next day, Effy sees Pandora with Cook and is hurt. When Effy confronts her, Pandora demonstrates a more empowered and mature side to herself and angrily informs Effy that Cook belongs to nobody. At that moment, Thomas returns and the two have a tearful reunion.

In "JJ," it is revealed that, despite Pandora's relationship with Thomas, she is still continuing an affair with Cook, after JJ sees her leaving his apartment and hides. Cook later confesses to his affair with Pandora after JJ gives him some drugs that make him more honest. This prompts an angry breakup between Pandora and Thomas in Effy Stonem.

In "Effy," Effy offers some Magic mushrooms she picked to the gang. The camp-out is later interrupted by Cook attempting to scare the lot of them. Cook then reveals the affair he and Pandora shared, causing Thomas to run off into the woods and leave, ending their relationship. Pandora punches Cook in the face, ending her affair with him. After discovering what Effy did to Katie that night, Pandora joins the gang in shunning Effy.

In "Katie and Emily," Thomas and Pandora eventually reconcile at the school prom night and their relationship is rekindled.

Series 4
In "Thomas," Pandora is shaken after a girl commits suicide at Thomas' nightclub. Having nowhere to go, she stays at Thomas' apartment with his mother and siblings. They quietly have sex in Thomas' room when everyone is asleep. Not long after, Thomas has sex with a girl from the local church and confesses his infidelity to Pandora afterwards. She is horrified and breaks up with him. Under advice from Effy, she does not take him back after he sorts out his and his family's lives, and throughout the series, continues to cruelly reject him.

Pandora makes fewer appearances in the series, usually seen alongside Effy at parties or continually rebuffing Thomas' persistent advances. Near the end, after Effy attempts suicide, she regularly visits her at the mental hospital in which she is being interred.

In "Everyone," Pandora and Katie organise a musical recital to attempt to cheer Effy up. After she manages to achieve exceptionally high grades, she is accepted into Harvard University in the United States, and Thomas, who had achieved a running scholarship, joins her, implying another reunion.

In an unseen scene, Pandora is revising for history in a local library, when she gets tutored by an expert. She is caught 'doodling', and accused of not taking her much needed help seriously. However, Pandora tries harder and makes progress in history. The history expert in the library is strongly implied to be Pandora's father, after a deep conversation between the two.

External links
Pandora Moon on the official E4 Skins site
Pandora Moon Character Blog on E4 Skins site
Pandora Moon on Myspace

Skins (British TV series) characters
Fictional English people
Television characters introduced in 2008
British female characters in television
Female characters in television
Teenage characters in television